Chad Orzel is a professor of physics and science author, noted for his books How to Teach Quantum Physics to Your Dog, which has been translated into 9 languages, and How to Teach Relativity to Your Dog. Chad as a science communicator is a regular contributor on Forbes.com, on his personal website, and, through October 2017, on ScienceBlogs.com, while continuing his work as an associate professor at Union College.

Background
Chad was born and raised in central New York state, near Binghamton. After attending Williams College, he spent two years as a post-doctoral researcher at Yale University, studying quantum mechanical effects in Bose-Einstein Condensates. He received his Ph.D. in Chemical Physics studying laser cooling at the National Institute of Standards and Technology from the University of Maryland, College Park under Nobel Laureate William Daniel Phillips. He is an associate professor in the Department of Physics and Astronomy at Union College in Schenectady, NY  where he specializes in atomic, molecular, and optical physics. Chad  maintained a blog at Uncertain Principles and has made web based presentations including a number of TED ED Talks. He was named a Fellow of the American Physical Society in 2021.

Writing career

In addition to teaching and doing research at Union, he maintained the physics-oriented blog Uncertain Principles as part of the ScienceBlogs project. (He now blogs at his own site.) He published his first book, How to Teach Quantum Physics to Your Dog (also called How to Teach Physics to Your Dog) in 2009. The book and its sequel How to Teach Relativity to Your Dog explain scientific concepts using a fictionalized version of Orzel's dog as an audience surrogate. The writing of Orzel comes from his passion for science and as responsibility as a scientist as referenced in Physics Central where he talks about his path to writing. "Along the way, Orzel became passionate not only about doing physics research but also about sharing his excitement about science with the public. In fact, Orzel views telling the world about the results of his experiments as one of the primary responsibilities of a scientist."
His latest publication out in 2018 "Breakfast with Einstein. (The Exotic Physics of everyday Objects)" takes a walk through a typical life and looks at all the physics that is going on around us. He is currently working on another book entitled "A Brief History of Timekeeping".

Personal life

He lives in Niskayuna, New York with his wife, Kate Nepveu, their two children. Emmy, the dog which was the sound board of exploring physics in his popular books "How to Teach Quantum Physics to Your Dog" and "How to Teach Relativity to Your Dog" has passed away but he introduces a new addition to the family by way of his blog in an entry entitled "Meet Charlie", another rescue dog.

Publications
 How to Teach Quantum Physics to Your Dog (Scribner, 2009) 
 How to Teach Relativity to Your Dog (Basic Books, 2012) 
 Eureka! Discovering Your Inner Scientist (Basic Books, 2014) 
 Breakfast with Einstein: The Exotic Physics of Everyday Objects (BenBella Books, 2018) 
 "Scientific Failure as a Public Good: Illustrating the Process of Science and Its Contrast with Pseudoscience" in Pseudoscience: The Conspiracy Against Science, edited by Allison B. Kaufman and James C. Kaufman (MIT Press, 2018) 
 A Brief History of Timekeeping (BenBella Books, 2022)

References

External links 

 Union College web page
Blog, Uncertain Principles
TED Ed Talks Particles and waves: The central mystery of quantum mechanics,What is the Heisenberg Uncertainty Principle?,Schrödinger's cat: A thought experiment in quantum mechanics,Einstein's brilliant mistake: Entangled states
Forbes.com
ScienceBlogs.com
ChadOrzel.com

Living people
21st-century American physicists
University of Maryland, College Park alumni
Quantum physicists
Science bloggers
Year of birth missing (living people)
Fellows of the American Physical Society